Dean Hiroshi Wilson (born December 17, 1969) is an American professional golfer.

Wilson was born in Kaneohe, Hawaii. He turned professional in 1992 after graduating from Brigham Young University and has won six times on the Japan Golf Tour and once on the PGA Tour. After a poor 2009 season Wilson lost his PGA Tour playing rights. He regained full tour status in 2010 while starting outside top 150 from previous year's money list. Wilson has not played a full season since 2011.

Professional wins (11)

PGA Tour wins (1)

PGA Tour playoff record (1–0)

Japan Golf Tour wins (6)

Other wins (4)
1999 Utah Open
2007 Hawaii State Open
2012 Hawaii State Open
2014 Hawaii State Open

Results in major championships

CUT = missed the half-way cut
"T" = tied

Results in The Players Championship

CUT = missed the halfway cut
"T" indicates a tie for a place

Results in World Golf Championships

"T" = Tied

See also
2002 PGA Tour Qualifying School graduates
2004 PGA Tour Qualifying School graduates

References

External links

American male golfers
BYU Cougars men's golfers
Japan Golf Tour golfers
PGA Tour golfers
Golfers from Hawaii
American Latter Day Saints
American sportspeople of Japanese descent
People from Honolulu County, Hawaii
1969 births
Living people